TKS Rega-Merida Trzebiatów is a Polish football club based in Trzebiatów.

History
The club's origins begin in 1947 as MLKS Rega Trzebiatów, however the club languished in the lower leagues throughout most of its history. In 2002 it was re-founded as a result of the merger of Rega Trzebiatów and Merida 1879, the latter of which got its name from the local army division. In the 2006/2007 season they have played in the Third Division, its highest division to date. In 2008 the club was reformed under its historic pre-merger name Rega Trzebiatów. In the winter of the 2010/2011, many key first team players left the team and its reserve team, Rega II Trzebiatów was liquidated and its players moved into the first squad to fill the void. After this, the club suffered multiple relegations until the 2014/15 season, when they won promotion back to the Fifth Division in a 7–1 win against derby rivals Sparta Gryfice.

League history

2002/03 - IV liga, West Pomeranian Group (11th place) (IV)
2003/04 - IV liga, West Pomeranian Group (11th place) (IV)
2004/05 - IV liga, West Pomeranian Group (7th place) (IV)
2005/06 - IV liga, West Pomeranian Group (1st place) (IV)
2006/07 - III liga, grupa 2 (9th place) (III)
2007/08 - III liga, grupa 2 (III)
2008/09 - III liga (IV)
2009/10 - III liga Group I (2nd place) (IV)
2010/11 - III liga Group I (17th place - relegated) (V)
2011/12 - IV liga, West Pomeranian Group (V)

References

External links
Official website

Association football clubs established in 2002
2002 establishments in Poland
Association football clubs established in 1947
1947 establishments in Poland
Gryfice County
Football clubs in West Pomeranian Voivodeship